Hexacylloepus is a genus of riffle beetles in the family Elmidae. There are about 19 described species in Hexacylloepus.

Species
These 19 species belong to the genus Hexacylloepus:

 Hexacylloepus abditus (Hinton, 1937)
 Hexacylloepus apicalis Hinton, 1940
 Hexacylloepus bassindalei Hinton, 1969
 Hexacylloepus ferrugineus (Horn, 1870) (rusty elmid)
 Hexacylloepus flavipes (Grouvelle, 1889)
 Hexacylloepus frater Hinton, 1939
 Hexacylloepus granosus (Grouvelle, 1889)
 Hexacylloepus granulosus (Sharp, 1882)
 Hexacylloepus heterelmoides Hinton, 1939
 Hexacylloepus horni (Hinton, 1937)
 Hexacylloepus indistinctus (Hinton, 1937)
 Hexacylloepus nirgua Hinton, 1973
 Hexacylloepus nothrus Spangler, 1966
 Hexacylloepus nunezi Hinton, 1973
 Hexacylloepus plaumanni (Hinton, 1937)
 Hexacylloepus quadratus (Darlington, 1927)
 Hexacylloepus scabrosus Hinton, 1940
 Hexacylloepus smithi (Grouvelle, 1898)
 Hexacylloepus sulcatus (Grouvelle, 1889)

References

Further reading

 
 
 
 
 

Elmidae
Articles created by Qbugbot